Jack O'Sullivan may refer to:
 Jack O'Sullivan (Australian footballer)
 Jack O'Sullivan (rugby union)

See also
 John O'Sullivan (disambiguation)